The Guxian Dam is a concrete gravity dam on the Luo River, a tributary of the Yellow River, in Luoning County, Henan Province, China. The primary purpose of the dam is flood control but it also generates hydroelectricity and provides water for irrigation. The dam's power station contains three 20 MW Francis turbine-generators for a total installed capacity of 60 MW. Construction on the dam began in 1958 but was suspended several times afterwards. It recommenced in 1978 and the reservoir began to fill in 1991. The dam's generators were commissioned in 1992 and the project complete in 1993. Flip buckets are used at the spillway base to dissipate water. On the right side of the spillway there are two intermediate orifice openings controlled by hydraulic press-operated radial gates. Two bottom outlets are set on the spillway's left side, also controlled by hydraulic press-operated radial gates. To the left of the bottom outlets is the power station.

See also

List of dams and reservoirs in China
List of major power stations in Henan

References

Dams in China
Hydroelectric power stations in Henan
Gravity dams
Dams completed in 1993